Felimare molloi is a species of sea slug, a dorid nudibranch, a shell-less marine gastropod mollusk in the family Chromodorididae.

Distribution 
This species was described from Isla Picuda, Chimanas, Mochima in the Caribbean Sea off Venezuela.

References

Chromodorididae
Gastropods described in 1996